Cancer Cell International is a peer-reviewed scientific journal that publishes papers on various aspects of cancer cell. The journal was established in 2001 and is published by Springer Science+Business Media.

Editorial process and journal scope 
Cancer Cell International is an open-access, online-only journal which publishes articles focused on cancer cell.

Journal publishes also articles on cancer studies with the data from experiments. Publish research articles based on data in many fields, from cell proliferation to apoptosis, etc.

As of 2022 editors-in-Chief are Domenico Coppola from Moffitt Cancer Center and Yasumasa Kato from Ohu University.

Abstracting and indexing 
The journal is abstracted and indexed for example in:

 Biological Abstracts
 DOAJ
 PubMed
 PubMed Central
 Science Citation Index Expanded
 SCImago
 Scopus
 Web of Science
 Zetoc

According to the Journal Citation Reports, the journal has a 2021 impact factor of 6.436.

References

External links 

 

English-language journals
Springer Science+Business Media academic journals
Oncology journals
Publications established in 2001